The Northern Cape women's cricket team, previously known as Griqualand West women's cricket team, is the women's representative cricket team for the South African province of Northern Cape. They compete in the Women's Provincial Programme and the CSA Women's Provincial T20 Competition.

History
The side first competed in the South African domestic system in 1951–52, playing in the Simon Trophy as Griqualand West. They competed in that tournament for two seasons, before not playing until they joined the Caltrate Inter-Provincial Tournament in 1997–98. They have competed in the tournament ever since, but have never made it to the knockout stages. In 2015, the side was renamed Northern Cape, bringing the name into line with the name of the province.

They have also competed in the CSA Women's Provincial T20 Competition since its inception in 2012–13, but have again never qualified for the knockout stages.

Players

Current squad
Based on squad announced for the 2021–22 season. Players in bold have international caps.

Notable players
Players who have played for Northern Cape and played internationally are listed below, in order of first international appearance (given in brackets):

  Susan Benade (2005)
  Annelie Minny (2007)
  Bernadine Bezuidenhout (2014)

See also
 Northern Cape (cricket team)

Notes

References

Women's cricket teams in South Africa
Cricket in the Northern Cape